Levittown station (formerly Levittown–Tullytown station) is a SEPTA Regional Rail station on the Trenton Line, located off Bristol Pike and Levittown Parkway in Tullytown, Pennsylvania. It opened in 1953.

History

The Pennsylvania Railroad's Tullytown was located between Cheston and Brown Streets, northeast of the modern station site. On April 26, 1953, the railroad replaced it with Levittown–Tullytown to serve the then-new namesake community.

The Pennsylvania Railroad folded into Penn Central in 1968. Amtrak took over intercity passenger service on May 1, 1971; Amtrak trains continued to stop at the station for a brief period. Penn Central continued to operated local and commuter service, which passed to Conrail in 1976 then finally to SEPTA Regional Rail in 1983 as the Trenton Line. SEPTA later reduced the station name to simply Levittown.

The station underwent a $37.3 million reconstruction project which includes fully accessible high-level platforms, a pedestrian overpass, and parking improvements. The new platforms and overpass and a new parking lot opened on October 15, 2018; the old underpass and north parking lots were closed for the remaining construction period. The station's reconstruction was completed and rededicated in October 2019.

Station layout

References

External links

SEPTA – Levittown Station
Station from Google Maps Street View

SEPTA Regional Rail stations
Former Amtrak stations in Pennsylvania
Former Pennsylvania Railroad stations
Stations on the Northeast Corridor
Railway stations in Bucks County, Pennsylvania
Railway stations in the United States opened in 1953